The 1980–81 NHL season was the 64th season of the National Hockey League. The New York Islanders were the top regular season team and the top playoff team, winning their second consecutive Stanley Cup by defeating the Minnesota North Stars in five games.

League business
This was the first season that the Calgary Flames played in Calgary, Alberta. Previously, they were the Atlanta Flames and played in Atlanta, Georgia.

Regular season
The season featured notable individual scoring milestones.

Wayne Gretzky of the Edmonton Oilers broke Bobby Orr's single season assist record, scoring 109 assists, and Phil Esposito's point record, scoring 164 points. He won his second of an unmatched eight straight Hart Trophies as the league's most valuable player

Mike Bossy of the New York Islanders became only the second man in NHL history to score 50 goals in his first 50 games. In the 50th game, played at his home rink, he had 48 goals going into the 3rd and final period (before the advent of overtime games). Bossy admitted being so embarrassed and upset that he contemplated not going out on the ice for the final period. However, Bossy got his 49th goal with 5:15 left to go in the game and the 50th with 1:50 remaining, sending the Nassau Coliseum into a delirium. Maurice Richard, the only other man to accomplish this feat, was on hand to congratulate Bossy.

Bossy's Islanders finished as regular season champions with 110 points with the St. Louis Blues finishing a close second at 107 points.

Final standings
Note: GP = Games played, W = Wins, L = Losses, T = Ties, Pts = Points, GF = Goals for, GA = Goals against, PIM = Penalties in minutes

Note: Teams that qualified for the playoffs are highlighted in bold

Prince of Wales Conference

Clarence Campbell Conference

Playoffs

The Stanley Cup playoffs would see the New York Islanders dominate on their way to winning their second consecutive Stanley Cup. Notably, in the first round against the Maple Leafs, the Isles swept a three-game series, outscoring Toronto 20–4. The Islanders would go on to defeat Edmonton in six games in the quarter-finals, and in the semi-finals, the Islanders swept the Rangers and outscored them 22–8.

In game one of the Edmonton-Montreal series, Wayne Gretzky had five assists. This was a single game playoff record.  Another distinction was in the Minnesota North Stars' sweep of the Boston Bruins; the two games the North Stars won in Boston Garden were the first games that the team had won in Boston, either regular season or playoff, since the team had joined the NHL in 1967.

Playoff bracket

Stanley Cup Finals

The Islanders defeated the Minnesota North Stars in the finals in five games. The Islanders were defeated only three times during the entire four round playoff run.

New York Islanders vs. Minnesota North Stars

Awards

All-Star teams

Player statistics

Scoring leaders
Note: GP = Games played; G = Goals; A = Assists; Pts = Points

Source: NHL.

Leading goaltenders

Coaches

Patrick Division
Calgary Flames: Al MacNeil
New York Islanders: Al Arbour
New York Rangers: Fred Shero and Craig Patrick
Philadelphia Flyers: Pat Quinn
Washington Capitals: Gary Green

Adams Division
Boston Bruins: Gerry Cheevers
Buffalo Sabres: Scotty Bowman
Minnesota North Stars: Glen Sonmor
Quebec Nordiques: Maurice Filion and Michel Bergeron
Toronto Maple Leafs: Joe Crozier

Norris Division
Detroit Red Wings: Wayne Maxner
Hartford Whalers: Don Blackburn
Los Angeles Kings: Bob Berry
Montreal Canadiens: Claude Ruel
Pittsburgh Penguins: Eddie Johnston

Smythe Division
Chicago Black Hawks: Keith Magnuson
Colorado Rockies: Bill MacMillan
Edmonton Oilers: Bryan Watson
St. Louis Blues: Red Berenson
Vancouver Canucks: Harry Neale
Winnipeg Jets: Mike Smith and Tom Watt

Milestones

Debuts
The following is a list of players of note who played their first NHL game in 1980–81 (listed with their first team, asterisk(*) marks debut in playoffs):
Barry Pederson, Boston Bruins
Steve Kasper, Boston Bruins
Denis Savard, Chicago Black Hawks
Steve Larmer, Chicago Black Hawks
Andy Moog, Edmonton Oilers
Charlie Huddy, Edmonton Oilers
Glenn Anderson, Edmonton Oilers
Jari Kurri, Edmonton Oilers
Paul Coffey, Edmonton Oilers
Larry Murphy, Los Angeles Kings
Dino Ciccarelli, Minnesota North Stars
Don Beaupre, Minnesota North Stars
Neal Broten, Minnesota North Stars
Doug Wickenheiser, Montreal Canadiens
Guy Carbonneau, Montreal Canadiens
Rick Wamsley, Montreal Canadiens
Brent Sutter, New York Islanders
Rollie Melanson, New York Islanders
Tim Kerr, Philadelphia Flyers
Mike Bullard, Pittsburgh Penguins
Anton Stastny, Quebec Nordiques
Peter Stastny, Quebec Nordiques
Dale Hunter, Quebec Nordiques
Paul MacLean, St. Louis Blues
Dave Babych, Winnipeg Jets

Last games
The following is a list of players of note that played their last game in the NHL in 1980–81 (listed with their last team):
Jean Ratelle, Boston Bruins
Terry Harper, Colorado Rockies
Pete Mahovlich, Detroit Red Wings
Tom Bladon, Detroit Red Wings
Phil Esposito, New York Rangers
Walt Tkaczuk, New York Rangers
Ron Ellis, Toronto Maple Leafs
Dennis Kearns, Vancouver Canucks
Bobby Schmautz, Vancouver Canucks
Dennis Ververgaert, Washington Capitals
Guy Charron, Washington Capitals
Wayne Stephenson, Washington Capitals
Jude Drouin, Winnipeg Jets

See also 
 33rd National Hockey League All-Star Game
 1980 NHL Entry Draft
 1980–81 NHL transactions
 1980 in sports
 1981 in sports
 List of Stanley Cup champions
 National Hockey League All-Star Game

References
 
 
 
 
 

Notes

External links
Hockey Database
NHL.com

 
1980–81 in Canadian ice hockey by league
1980–81 in American ice hockey by league